AO-38 may refer to:

 USS Winooski (AO-38),  United States Navy oiler which saw service during World War II
 AO-38 assault rifle, a Russian firearm